Semalar is a village settlement nearby Butwal in Rupandehi District in Lumbini Province of southern Nepal. At the time of the 1991 Nepal census it had a population of 8,636 people living in 1,124 individual households.

References

Populated places in Rupandehi District